Rineloricaria lima is a species of catfish in the family Loricariidae. It is native to South America, where it is known from Argentina, Brazil, and Uruguay. The species is believed to be a facultative air-breather.

References 

Fish described in 1853
Catfish of South America
Fish of Brazil
Fish of Argentina
Fish of Uruguay
Loricariini